Daniel William Gormally (born 4 May 1976) is an English chess Grandmaster. His peak rating is 2573, achieved in the January 2006 rating list.

Chess career
He was born in South Shields and was brought into the game of chess by his father at the age of 7. Both being members of the South Shields Chess Club.

He shared first place at the Politiken Cup in 1998 and in 2003, won the Challengers tournament of the 78th Hastings International Chess Congress.

In September 2006, he tied for 2nd-9th with Luke McShane, Stephen J. Gordon, Gawain Jones, Šarūnas Šulskis, Luís Galego, Klaus Bischoff and Karel van der Weide in the 2nd EU Individual Championship in Liverpool. In November 2006 Gormally was joint winner of the British Rapidplay Chess Championship.

In 2015 he tied for the second place with David Howell and Nicholas Pert in the 102nd British Championship and eventually finished fourth on tiebreak. Also in 2015, he appeared as a contestant in three episodes of the television quiz Fifteen To One and in one episode of The Chase.

Gormally played for the English national team in the 2005 European Team Chess Championship and 2006 Chess Olympiad.

Bibliography

References

External links
Daniel Gormally chess games at 365Chess.com

1976 births
Living people
Chess grandmasters
English chess players
British chess writers
Chess Olympiad competitors
Place of birth missing (living people)